Canadian Forces Base Borden (also CFB Borden, French: Base des Forces canadiennes Borden or BFC Borden), formerly RCAF Station Borden, is a large Canadian Forces base located in Ontario. The historic birthplace of the Royal Canadian Air Force, CFB Borden is home to the largest training wing in the Canadian Armed Forces. The base is run by Canadian Forces Support Training Group (CFSTG) and reports to the Canadian Defence Academy (CDA) in Kingston.

History

At the height of the First World War, the Borden Military Camp opened at a location on a glacial moraine west of Barrie in 1916 to train units for the Canadian Expeditionary Force. It was named for Sir Frederick William Borden, former Minister of Militia. In May 1916, the Barrie and Collingwood companies of the 157th Battalion (Simcoe Foresters), CEF (perpetuated today by The Grey and Simcoe Foresters), under the command of Lieutenant-Colonel D.H. MacLaren, began construction of the camp. Camp Borden was selected in 1917 for a military aerodrome, becoming the first flying station of the Royal Flying Corps Canada. 

During the inter-war period, the aerodrome was used as the training location for the nascent Royal Canadian Air Force (RCAF) and was renamed RCAF Station Borden. Camp Borden's training grounds were expanded in 1938 to house the Canadian Tank School. The Siskins were a RCAF aerobatic flying team that was established in 1929 at Camp Borden. 

During the Second World War, both Camp Borden and RCAF Station Borden became the most important training facility in Canada, housing both army training and flight training, the latter under the British Commonwealth Air Training Plan (BCATP). The BCATP's No. 1 Service Flying Training School (SFTS) was located here until 1946. Relief landing fields were located at Alliston and Edenvale. A third landing field, known locally as Leach's Field, was operated by Camp Borden from the 1920s to the 1950s. The L-shaped airstrip was rudimentary; the "runways" at Leach's Field utilized the existing ground surface. It was primarily used for touch-and-go flying.

During the Cold War, Borden's importance as an RCAF facility in Ontario declined in favour of CFB Trenton, CFB Uplands and CFB North Bay. However, its use as an army facility stayed consistent until 1970 when a major reorganization of the combat arms' schools resulted in the transfer of the Infantry School and Armoured School to CFB Gagetown in New Brunswick. On the other hand, numerous "purple" (i.e. tri-service) schools were established or expanded from existing service training establishments, including the Canadian Forces School of Administration and Logistics, the School of Aerospace Ordnance Engineering and the Canadian Forces Health Service Training Centre. The February 1, 1968 unification of the RCAF with the Royal Canadian Navy and the Canadian Army resulted in the creation of the Canadian Forces. The military facilities consisting of Camp Borden and RCAF Station Borden were grouped under a new name, Canadian Forces Base Borden (CFB Borden). The aerodrome was closed in 1970 and the base saw use as a regular and reserve training facility for Canadian Forces Land Force Command (the army), as well as hosting various land-based training courses for Canadian Forces Air Command (the air force). 

In a 1990s reorganization of the Canadian Forces following the end of the Cold War, CFB Borden's air force training facilities were grouped under the name 16 Wing Borden. The eight surviving Royal Flying Corps hangars at the base have been designated a National Historic Site of Canada.

Plaque
The Ontario Heritage Foundation, Ministry of Culture and Recreation erected a plaque in 1976.

Activities and facilities
Although originally an air force training base, CFB Borden is now a training base for several elements of the Canadian Forces:
 2 Canadian Air Division's (2 Cdn Air Div) primary lodger unit, 16 Wing, commonly referred to as 16 Wing Borden, consists of 16 Wing Headquarters and three schools: the Canadian Forces School of Aerospace Technology and Engineering (CFSATE), the Royal Canadian Air Force Academy (RCAF Academy), and the Canadian Forces School of Aerospace Control (CFSACO), located in Cornwall, Ontario.
 The Canadian Army's (CA) Regular Force and Primary Reserve army units use a number of training schools and large portions of the base's  training area for manoeuvres. In addition to these specific environmental element commands, CFB Borden houses a variety of other purple trades training facilities and headquarters within the Canadian Forces, including a fire-fighting school, Military Police (MP) school, a chaplaincy school, the Canadian Forces Recruiting Group, medical, dental and language schools, and supports local cadet and reserve units. The Toronto Police Service's Emergency Task Force also trains there occasionally. CFB Borden hosts the Blackdown Cadet Training Centre, a facility established for training army cadets. This facility has also hosted air cadets and sea cadets since 2003, when the Borden Air Cadet Summer Training Centre was closed. CFB Borden's residential area houses one regulation-sized golf course (Circled Pine Golf Course, par 72). Circled Pine Golf Course opened in 1952. The course is open to the public and serving Military. The base previously housed a 9-hole links style course, Anderson Park, which originally opened in 1917 but closed after the 2015 season. Base Borden has multiple facilities available to Canadian Armed Forces members that include the Terra theatre, Circled Pine Bowling Centre, two gyms (Buell Fitness & Aquatic Centre and the sub gym, aka 'the bubble'), multiple soccer fields, baseball diamonds, Andy Anderson arena and biking trails. The Base Borden Military Museum (combining four separate museums) has numerous items, equipment and vehicles from all eras of Canadian military history, including a large number of armoured vehicles and aircraft displayed outside in Worthington Park and around the headquarters area of the base. In December 2017, a military parade of the RCAF took place in honour of the anniversary of the Battle of Britain. In August 2010, the Canadian department of Defence announced a C$209 million series of projects to construct new facilities, and upgrade existing facilities, at CFB Borden.
 A voluntary Canadian military band is maintained at the base. A band at Borden was first formed in the late 1930s, before becoming the No. 6 Bomber Group Band under the leadership of Clifford Hunt. It was stationed in the United Kingdom from 1942-1946. The modern band is organized only during the summer and consists of reservists from all three services who serve at the Canadian Forces Logistics Training Centre.

Aerodrome
Three runways were listed as follows:

At some point after the Second World War, runway 11/29 was abandoned and the other two runways were shortened. Just prior to 2004, the runways were listed as follows:

In 2004, the decision was made to close the remaining runways to all aircraft other than helicopters.  Only the taxiway and a small section of runway 05/23 remain today (the rest is covered with grass). A helicopter pad is still active at the base of the former runway.

Units
The main units of Canadian Forces Base Borden are:

Integral
HQ
Technical Services
Base Operations
Administration Branch
Comptroller Branch
Management Advisory Services
Military Personnel Generation Training Group (MPGTG) HQ

Lodger
Canadian Forces Ammunition Depot Angus
Canadian Forces Recruiting Group HQ
31 Canadian Forces Health Services Centre
32 Signal Regiment, 1 Squadron
Canadian Forces Health Services Training Centre
1 Dental Unit Detachment Borden
Royal Canadian Electrical and Mechanical Engineering School
Canadian Forces Military Police Academy
3rd Canadian Ranger Patrol Group
The Grey and Simcoe Foresters
400 Tactical Helicopter Squadron
Regional Cadet Support Unit Central
Regional Cadet Instruction School Central
Blackdown Cadet Training Centre
Shared Services Canada Detachment Borden
Military Police Detachment Borden
Real Property Operations Detachment (Borden)
Civilian Human Resources Centre
Deputy Judge Advocate – Borden
Learning and Career Centre
Dispute Resolution Centre
Complaint Management Centre
PSP National Training Centre
16 Wing Borden HQ
Canadian Forces School of Aerospace Technology and Engineering
Royal Canadian Air Force Academy

MPGTG
Canadian Forces Chaplain School and Centre (CFChSC)
Canadian Forces Fire and CBRN Academy (CFFCA)
Canadian Forces Logistics Training Centre (CFLTC)
Canadian Forces Training Development Centre (CFTDC)
Canadian Forces School of Music (CFSM)
Canadian Forces School of Aerospace Technology and Engineering (CFSATE)
Canadian Forces Military Police Academy (CFMPA)

Tributes
The aircraft control tower is dedicated to the memory of Royal Flying Corps Cadet James Harold Talbot. Talbot became the first fatality at Camp Borden when his Curtiss J.N.4 'Jenny' aeroplane crashed on April 8, 1917. The Air Force Annex of the Base Borden Military Museum is dedicated in memory of First World War Victoria Cross recipient Lieutenant Alan Arnett McLeod, the youngest Canadian airman to receive the award. Worthington Park, a part of the Base Borden Military Museum complex, is named after Major-General F. F. Worthington (Frederic Franklin Worthington), the father of the Royal Canadian Armoured Corps. General Worthington is buried in Worthington Park.

Air shows

On specific days, CFB Borden organised air shows. For example:
In 2016, CFB Borden organised an air show for the centennial of the Royal Canadian Air Force.
In 2017, CFB Borden organised an air show for the 150th anniversary of Canada.
In 2018, CFB Borden organised an air show for Canadian Armed Forces Day.

Economy
CFB Borden local spending impact: $296,062,000
CFB Borden estimated local spending impacts: $472,387,000 (direct & indirect)
CFB Borden estimated direct employment: 5,158
CFB Borden estimated indirect employment: 518

Federal heritage
The Building O-102 at CFB Borden was recognized as a federal heritage building in 1995. Constructed in 1948 to plans prepared in 1945, Building O-102 is associated with the massive construction and modernization program undertaken by the Department of National Defence at the end of WWII.

Architecture
CFB Borden has several Federal Heritage buildings on the Register of the Government of Canada Heritage Buildings:
Alexander Dunn Public School P-148 Recognized - 1995
Barrie Armoury Recognized - 1997
Croil Hall Building A-142 Recognized - 2003
Dyte Hall A-78 Recognized - 1995
Hangars 3, 5, 6, 7, 10, 11, 12 and 13 Classified - 1988
Headquarters Building O-102 Recognized - 1995
Hennessy Block Building S-136 Recognized - 1995
Junior Ranks Quarters T-114 and T-115 Recognized - 1995
Maple Mess A-74 Recognized - 1995
Museum Building E-108 Recognized - 1995
Non Commissioned Officer Building O-109 Recognized - 1995

See also

Nottawasaga River Rats
Ontario Highway 90
Ontario Highway 131
Emergency Government Headquarters

References

 Bruce Forsyth's Canadian Military History Page

External links

 Department of National Defence Canada - CFB Borden - official site
 16 Wing Borden - official site
 The Citizen - official newspaper of CFB Borden
 Base Borden Military Museum 

Canadian Forces bases in Ontario
1916 establishments in Ontario
Airports of the British Commonwealth Air Training Plan
Simcoe County
Heliports in Ontario
Military airbases in Ontario